Willaston is a village in the unitary authority of Cheshire West and Chester, England. In and around the village are 16 buildings that are recorded in the National Heritage List for England as designated listed buildings.  Of these, one is listed at Grade II*, the middle grade, and the others are at Grade II.  Most of the listed buildings are houses, or farms with associated structures; the other buildings include the village church, a former windmill converted for domestic use, a war memorial, and a former railway station used as a visitor centre.

Key

Buildings

References

Citations

Sources

Listed buildings in Cheshire West and Chester
Lists of listed buildings in Cheshire
Listed buildings